The  Amarillo Venom season was the team's seventh season as a professional indoor football franchise and first in the Indoor Football League (IFL). One of twenty-five teams competing in the IFL for the 2010 season, the Amarillo, Texas-based West Texas Roughnecks were members of the Lonestar West Division of the Intense Conference.

With the af2 breaking up and its larger market teams moving to Arena Football 1, the Dusters were forced to find a new league. Owner Randy Sanders applied for his team's spot in the Indoor Football League (IFL), and they were accepted as an expansion franchise.

The Venom lost to the Arkansas Diamonds 34-46 in the Intense Conference Semifinals.

Schedule

Regular season

Playoffs

Standings

Roster

References

External links
Amarillo Venom official statistics

Amarillo Venom
Amarillo Venom seasons
Amarillo Venom